Achilleas Domokos F.C. is a Greek football club, based in Domokos, Phthiotis.

The club was founded in 1930. They will play in Eps Phthiotis first category championship  for the season 2014-15.

Football clubs in Central Greece
Sport in Phthiotis
Association football clubs established in 1930
1930 establishments in Greece